Stuart Kettlewell (born 4 June 1984) is a Scottish football coach and former player who is the manager of Scottish Premiership club Motherwell.

He played as a midfielder for Queen's Park, Clyde, Ross County and Brora Rangers.

Playing career

Queen's Park
Kettlewell began his career with Queen's Park. He made 182 appearances for the Spiders in all competitions, scoring 11 goals, and held the captain's armband from 2006 until he left the club.

Clyde
Kettlewell became Clyde's first summer signing of 2008, when he joined the Broadwood side on 19 May. He made his Clyde debut in July 2008, in a 2–0 victory over Annan Athletic in the Scottish Challenge Cup. He was appointed team captain before the game. His contract was terminated in June 2009, following Clyde's relegation and financial troubles.

Ross County
On 11 June 2009, Kettlewell signed for Ross County. He made his debut on 8 August 2009, in a 2–1 win against Airdrie United. In May 2013, Kettlewell signed a new contract at Ross County after the club had finished fifth in their first season in the Scottish Premier League. He had an operation to cure a hip injury just before his contract expired at the end of the 2013–14 season. Ross County allowed Kettlewell to remain with the club while he completed his rehabilitation, but he was then released in August 2014.

Brora Rangers
Kettlewell then signed for Highland League club Brora Rangers. On 2 May 2015, he scored the winning kick in a penalty shootout, after a 2–2 aggregate draw, as Brora defeated Lowland League champions Edinburgh City in a promotion play-off. Brora then lost a promotion / relegation playoff against Montrose, who had finished last in 2014–15 Scottish League Two.

Coaching career

Ross County
Kettlewell returned to Ross County to coach their under-20 team in 2016. Under his management, County won the 2016–17 SPFL Development League. After Owen Coyle resigned in March 2018, Kettlewell and academy director Steve Ferguson were appointed co-managers at Ross County. This arrangement continued until June 2020, when Kettlewell was placed in sole control. Kettlewell was sacked on 19 December 2020, after a 2–0 defeat against Hamilton left the club four points adrift at the bottom of the 2020–21 Scottish Premiership table.

Motherwell
On 3 October 2022, Kettlewell was appointed lead development coach at Motherwell. He became their caretaker manager in February 2023, after Steven Hammell was sacked. He led them to victories in their first two games, and then became their manager on a permanent basis on 22 February.

Managerial statistics

initially interim and appointed permanently on 22 February 2022

Honours

Player
Ross County
Scottish Challenge Cup: 2010–11
SFL First Division: 2011–12

Brora Rangers
Highland Football League: 2014–15
North of Scotland Cup: 2014–15

Manager
Ross County

Scottish Championship: 2018-19
Scottish Challenge Cup: 2018–19

Individual
 Scottish Championship Manager of the year: 2018-19
 Scottish Premiership Manager of the Month: February 2023
 Scottish Championship Manager of the Month (3): September 2018, October 2018, April 2019

References

External links

Living people
1984 births
Scottish footballers
Queen's Park F.C. players
Clyde F.C. players
Ross County F.C. players
Scottish Football League players
Footballers from Glasgow
Association football midfielders
Scottish Premier League players
Scottish Professional Football League players
Brora Rangers F.C. players
Scottish football managers
Ross County F.C. managers
Scottish Professional Football League managers
Motherwell F.C. non-playing staff
Motherwell F.C. managers
Ross County F.C. non-playing staff